Myosin light chain kinase 2 also known as MYLK2 is an enzyme which in humans is encoded by the MYLK2 gene.

Function 

This gene encodes a myosin light chain kinase, a calcium / calmodulin dependent enzyme, that is exclusively expressed in adult skeletal muscle.  The MYLK2 gene expresses skMLCK more prevalently in fast twitch muscle fibers as compared to slow twitch muscle fibers.  Calmodulin is composed of two terminal domains (N,C) each containing two E-F hand motifs that bind to Ca2+.  Upon saturation of Ca2+, Calmodulin undergoes a conformation change allowing it to bind with a target protein such as skMLCK.  An image depicting a similar complex (sdCen/skMLCK2) is shown under myosin light chain kinase.    This binding to skMLCK increases the affinity of Ca2+ and ultimately leads to a sustained muscle action.

Clinical significance 

Mutations in the MYLK2 gene have been linked to midventricular hypertrophic cardiomyopathy.

References

Further reading

}

EC 2.7.11